is a Japanese manga series written and illustrated by Miyake Taishi. It started serialization in the shōnen manga magazine Dragon Age Pure since 2006.

Plot

The story is set in a time when the world is beset by monsters and other creatures with mystical abilities.  The story centers around Ash Grave and Mirim.  Ash is a descendant of the god of death and is also known as the "black-winged devil", while Mirim is a Crimson, a top-ranking member of the "Ten Pillar Swords Guild" and the wielder of one of the ten crimson blades forged by the gods to protect the world.  They both have a common goal; revenge upon the "Descendants of the Gods", who seek to purify the world of humanity.

Ash is somewhat of a pacifist in the vein of Vash the Stampede from Trigun, believing strongly in the value of human life and its endless possibilities; a view he gained from a young human girl eight hundred years ago named Mia, who bandaged his wounds in spite of his kind being at war with humanity.  His enemies and kin, on the other hand, have retreated to obscurity, particularly in the hierarchy of the Church, to carry out a centuries-long plot to eliminate the humans who defeated them in the long-ago conflict.

Characters 

So far the characters of crimson grave can be classified as either normal humans, Crimsons, monsters or descendants of the gods.

Ash Grave is a descendant of the god of death and the main character of the manga.  He is often called the "Black-winged Devil" by many humans in the series due to both his past actions and due to propaganda by the other hidden Descendants of the Gods.  He was originally a blood thirsty monster who killed anything in his wake until, eight hundred years ago, a little human girl named Mia healed his wounds after an unknown incident.  It was from her that he received the idea of killing being abhorrent because all living being have the possibility for good regardless of their ancestry or past actions.  After his brethren discovered his "betrayal" they killed Mia, and Ash vowed to kill every single one of his kin, either in response to her death or because of other yet-unrevealed events.  Their possibilities, he says, are closed; they cannot be redeemed.  As a powerful Descendant of the Gods, Ash possesses super-human strength and speed, can regenerate and fly, and has been shown to manipulate darkness as an attack.  Almost inevitably, his actions are interpreted by the humans he saves as yet another monstrous murder, with only a few knowing the truth.  It's hinted that he was a companion of the original ten Crimsons who defeated the Descendants of the Gods long ago.  He's somewhat laid back and cheerful in personality and possesses a mildly lecherous streak when it comes to Mirim.
Mirim Ixus is a young member of the Ten Pillar Swords Guild and a wielder of one of the ten legendary crimson blades forged by the gods to vanquish evil. Due to the blade's power she possesses super human speed and strength and has been shown to be able to demolish entire buildings in a single stroke. She was traumatized by the destruction of her village by a descendant of the gods who looks exactly like Ash Grave; such a figure is shown in an early chapter and identified as a "descendant of the death god like Ash".  Mirim has vowed to kill him, no matter what the cost.  She's tends to be somewhat strait-laced and righteous, but a little clumsy and naive. She wears her hair in two pig-tails usually, and is noted to have a large amount of cleavage. She is also hinted to like Ash. Her kohai is Rena-chan, who seems to have wild fantasies about Mirim, which always cause a big misunderstanding. She is often put into harassing situations.

References

Shōnen manga

ja:クリムゾングレイヴ